Noson Lawen is a Welsh language-phrase for a party with music, similar to a ceilidh.

Further reading 
 R. W. Jones, Bywyd Cymdeithasol Cymru yn y Ddeunawfed Ganrif (London, 1931), p. 86.

Welsh folk music